The TRUMPF Group is a German industrial machine manufacturing company. It is a family-owned company with its head office in Ditzingen near Stuttgart. TRUMPF is one of the world's biggest providers of machine tools. With more than 70 operative subsidiaries, the TRUMPF Group is represented in all important markets worldwide. Its production facilities are based in China, Germany, France, the UK, Italy, Japan, Mexico, Austria, Poland, Switzerland, the Czech Republic and the US.

Divisions 
The two divisions Machine Tools and Laser Technology are under the umbrella of a holding company, TRUMPF GmbH + Co. KG. In the past they sold their Medical Technology division. This sector is now a part of the Hill-Rom Holdings.

Machine Tools 

The larger area of activity comprises machine tools for flexible sheet metal and tube processing. Trumpf offers machines for bending, punching, combined punch and laser processing, and also laser cutting and welding applications. Diverse automation solutions and a range of software for digitally connected production solutions round off the portfolio.

Laser Technology 

The product range in laser technology comprises laser systems for the cutting, welding and surface treatment of three-dimensional components. Trumpf also provides high-performance  lasers, disk and fiber lasers, direct diode lasers, ultrashort pulse lasers, and also marking lasers and marking systems. 3D printing machines for metal components were added to the portfolio in 2015. In 2020, Trumpf concludes the renovation and integration of his 100 % subsidiary Spi Lasers (fiber laser) into the Trumpf group and under the trump mark. The company Spi Lasers UK Ltd. With a seat in Southampton (UK), now operates under the name Trumpf Laser UK Ltd.

Company history

Beginnings 

In 1923, Christian Trumpf and two partners acquired Julius Geiger GmbH, a machine shop in Stuttgart. The company manufactured flexible shafts used in metal processing machines, amongst other applications, and motor-driven hand shears for cutting sheet metal. In 1933, the company moved to the Stuttgart suburb of Weilimdorf. During World War II, TRUMPF continued with the production of electric shears and flexible shafts. The production buildings remained undamaged.

The economic miracle years 

During the post-war years, stationary machines for sheet metal processing were a main constituent of the product program. In 1950, TRUMPF employed 145 people, and its sales exceeded 1 million DEM. Ten years later, these figures had increased to 325 employees and sales of 11 million DEM. In 1963, the company founded its first foreign company at the Swiss town of Baar in the Canton of Zug.

World market 

In 1968, TRUMPF manufactured the TRUMATIC 20, the first sheet metal fabrication machine with a numerical control system. It enabled fully automatic work at the machine, right down to tool changes, for the very first time. All the information required to process sheet metal was stored on perforated computer tape.

One year later, the company founded a U.S. subsidiary in Farmington, Connecticut. Farmington is now the company's second-largest location and is the headquarters for the entire U.S. market. In 1972, TRUMPF shifted its headquarters to Ditzingen. In 1978, Berthold Leibinger was appointed chairman of the Managing Board, and founded a subsidiary in Japan in the same year.

Laser 

In 1985, TRUMPF presented its own CO2 laser, the LASER TLF 1000. It had 1 kW of beam performance and is the first compact laser resonator with radio-frequency excitation. In 1988, TRUMPF Lasertechnik GmbH was founded.

In 1992, the solid-state laser sector began with its participation in the firm of Haas Laser GmbH in Schramberg. The company is now 100-percent owned by the TRUMPF Group. On November 20, 1998, a new laser factory was opened at the company's headquarters in Ditzingen.

The machines are manipulated with NC (Numerical Control) or own NF (Numerical Control for TRUMPF) file formats. These were made exclusively for work with TRUMPF machines.

New business activities 
In the 1990s, Trumpf complemented its portfolio by integrating new methods of sheet metal processing like bending (1992) and tube processing (1999). Completely new fields like medical technology were tapped as well. This was, however, sold again to Hillrom in 2013. On November 28, 2020, the TRUMPF group added its wholly-owned fiber laser manufacturing subsidiary SPI Lasers under the TRUMPF brand.

Change of generation 

In 2005, shortly before his 75th birthday, Berthold Leibinger retired from the Managing Board after 40 years. His daughter  Nicola Leibinger-Kammüller was appointed as the new president and Chairwoman of the Managing Board. As well as her brother Peter Leibinger, the vice-chairman of the Managing Board, her husband Mathias Kammüller also has a seat on the Managing Board.

Smart Factory 
In September 2017 the company has opened a new technology center in Hoffman Estates, Illinois, for Industry 4.0 solutions that is designed for digitally connected production processes.

Key figures of the TRUMPF Group

References 

1923 establishments in Germany
Companies based in Ditzingen
German brands
Industrial machine manufacturers
Machine tool builders
Manufacturing companies established in 1923
Medical and health organisations based in Baden-Württemberg
Medical technology companies of Germany
Multinational companies headquartered in Germany